The Pro.Mecc Sparviero is an Italian ultralight aircraft, designed and produced by Pro.Mecc of Corigliano d'Otranto. The Sparviero is supplied as a kit for amateur construction or a complete ready-to-fly-aircraft.

Design and development
The Sparviero was designed to conform to the Fédération Aéronautique Internationale microlight rules. It features a cantilever low-wing, a two-seats-in-side-by-side configuration enclosed cockpit under a bubble canopy, fixed tricycle landing gear and a single engine in tractor configuration.

The Sparviero is made predominantly from carbon fibre, with the wing skins fabricated from fibreglass. The standard engine fitted is the  Rotax 912ULS four-stroke powerplant, with the  Rotax 912UL optional. In 2011 a fast-build kit was introduced that provides a completed and painted fuselage and wings, requiring the builder only to carry out the engine and electrical installations.

The Sparviero was later developed into the Pro.Mecc Freccia Anemo, with additional streamlining and a new elliptical planform wing.

Operational history
Reviewer Marino Boric described the design in a 2015 review as, "not only stylish, but aggressively low-priced for mainly built of carbonfiber...."

Variants
Sparviero
Initial model
Sparviero 100
Improved model introduced in December 2009 with a lighter empty weight, higher cruise speed, lower-mounted seats and lower canopy.

Specifications (Sparviero 100)

References

External links

2000s Italian ultralight aircraft
Single-engined tractor aircraft